Pétanque at the 2015 Southeast Asian Games was held in The Padang, Singapore from 6 to 15 June 2015.

Participating nations
A total of 91 athletes from 10 nations will be competing in pétanque at the 2015 Southeast Asian Games:

Competition schedule
The following is the competition schedule for the pétanque competitions:

Medalists

Men

Women

Mixed

Medal table

References

External links
  

2015
Southeast Asian Games
2015 Southeast Asian Games events